Bondurant is a city in Polk County, Iowa, United States. The population was 7,365 in the 2020 census, an increase of 90.8% from the 3,860 population in 2010. It is part of the Des Moines–West Des Moines Metropolitan Statistical Area.

History
Bondurant was founded in 1884. In 1892, the Chicago Great Western Railway built the Bondurant railway station. Bondurant incorporated as a city on December 23, 1897. The city was named for Alexander C. Bondurant, who was the area's first settler in 1857.

Tornado
On July 19, 2018, at approximately 3 p.m., an EF2 tornado struck the city and lifted the entire second floor off a house, save for the second-floor bathroom's toilet. The tornado was the second of two EF2 tornadoes that were on the ground simultaneously. The first tornado, which missed Bondurant, provided a clear warning as the second tornado formed shortly afterwards.

Current elected officials

Geography
Bondurant is located at  (41.694304, -93.461488).

Bondurant is located in the heartland of Iowa, and can be directly accessed by U.S. Route 65 (from the northeast or southwest) or NE 78th Ave (from the west).

Demographics

2010 census
There were 1,422 housing units, of which 1,362 were occupied.

Of the 1,362 households 1,021 (75%) were families, with 641 families having children under the age of 18. The age population was spread out, with 1279 (33.1%) under the age of 18, 2339 (60.6%) from 18 to 65, and 242 (6.3%) who were 65 or older. The median age was 29.7 years with the male population being 1,931 (50%) and the female population 1,929 (50%).

The racial makeup of the city in the 2010 census was 96.5% White American, 0.6% African American,  0.1% Native Americans in the United States, 0.8% Asian American, 0.0% Native Hawaiians or Pacific Islander American,  0.4% other races and 1.6% were from two or more races. Of those 1.7%  were Hispanic and Latino Americans.

2000 census
At the 2000 census there were 1,846 people in 659 households, including 508 families, in the city. The racial makeup of the city was 98.43% White, 0.22% Native American, 0.16% Asian, 0.33% from other races, and 0.87% from two or more races. Hispanic or Latino of any race were 0.87%.

Of the 659 households, 46.9% had children under the age of 18 living with them, 61.9% were married couples living together, 12.1% had a female householder with no husband present, and 22.9% were non-families. 19.9% of households were one person, and 6.5% were one person aged 65 or older. The average household size was 2.80 and the average family size was 3.24.

The age distribution was 33.1% under the age of 18, 6.4% from 18 to 24, 34.9% from 25 to 44, 19.2% from 45 to 64, and 6.3% 65 or older. The median age was 32 years. For every 100 females, there were 98.1 males. For every 100 females age 18 and over, there were 91.5 males

The median household income was $52,877,  and the median family income  was $56,989. Males had a median income of $35,000 versus $26,309 for females. The per capita income for the city was $19,196. About 3.1% of families and 5.7% of the population were below the poverty line, including 6.3% of those under age 18 and 7.7% of those age 65 or over.

Education
The Bondurant–Farrar Community School District operates local area public schools.

References

External links

The City of Bondurant, Iowa Website Portal style website, Government, Business, Library, Recreation and more
Bondurant Chamber of Commerce
Bondurant Community Library

Cities in Iowa
Cities in Polk County, Iowa
Des Moines metropolitan area
Populated places established in 1884
1884 establishments in Iowa